Arkadiusz Czartoryski (born 14 April 1966) is a Polish politician. He was elected to the Sejm on 25 September 2005, getting 14,753 votes in 18 Siedlce district as a candidate from the Law and Justice list.

See also
Members of Polish Sejm 2005-2007

External links
Arkadiusz Czartoryski - parliamentary page - includes declarations of interest, voting record, and transcripts of speeches.

1966 births
Living people
People from Ostrołęka
Law and Justice politicians
Members of the Polish Sejm 2005–2007
Members of the Polish Sejm 2007–2011
Members of the Polish Sejm 2011–2015
Members of the Polish Sejm 2015–2019
Members of the Polish Sejm 2019–2023
Recipients of the Pro Memoria Medal